Wang Shaoguang (born 1954) is a Chinese political scientist. He is currently an emeritus professor at the Department of Government and Public Administration of the Chinese University of Hong Kong. A critic of Western representative democracy, his particular research interests include the history of the Cultural Revolution, sortition, the welfare state, and the comparative politics of East Asia.

Life
Born in Wuhan, Hubei, Wang worked as a high school teacher in Wuhan from 1972 to 1977. He then studied at Peking University, graduating in 1982, and moved to Cornell University in the U.S., where he received a doctorate in 1990. He taught at Yale University from 1990 to 2000 before moving to the Chinese University of Hong Kong, where he became a professor at the Department of Government and Public Administration. In 1993, Wang co-authored the "Wang Shaoguang Proposal" with economist Hu Angang, a public policy report that argued that the taxation reforms of Deng Xiaoping had weakened the Chinese state, and advocated fiscal centralisation in response.

Views 
Wang is a leading member of the Chinese New Left. 

He is a critic of Western representative democracy, which he believes has failed and degenerated into "electocracy", and more generally of the focus on competitive elections as part of political reform. Wang argues that the view of democracy as primarily electoral democracy only became accepted in the postwar period, owing mainly to the work of Joseph Schumpeter and his book Capitalism, Socialism and Democracy. Instead, he states, the "people should be involved in the whole process of decision-making, not only in choosing the decision-maker per se". 

He also distinguishes accountability from responsibility and political responsiveness, holding that genuine democracy must combine all three: "democratic" governments are often accountable in that they may be removed in competitive elections, Wang posits, but they are still not responsive to popular needs and demands.

Works
 
 , with Hu Angang.
 , with Hu Angang.

References

Further reading
  Interview with Wang Shaoguang by journalist Ma Ya, originally published in 2012.

External links
 Faculty page at Chinese University of Hong Kong

Living people
1954 births
Chinese political scientists
Chinese political philosophers
Chinese New Left
Academic staff of the Chinese University of Hong Kong
Peking University alumni
Cornell University alumni
Yale University faculty
21st-century Chinese philosophers
Date of birth missing (living people)